Viktor Yevgenievich Panin (10 November 1930 – 25 September 2020) was a Soviet and Russian physicist, professor, and advisor of the Russian Academy of Sciences. He was an expert in the fields of solid mechanics, plastic deformation and physical materials.

Curriculum vitae
 1979 — Head of Solid State Physics and Materials Science at the Institute of Atmospheric Optics, USSR Academy of Sciences
 From 1984 to 2002 — founder and director of Institute of Strength Physics and Materials Science SB RAS
 From 2002 to present — Adviser Academy of Sciences of Institute of Strength Physics and Materials Science SB RAS

He was a Foreign Member of the National Academy of Sciences of Belarus since 1999.

Scientific achievements
Under the guidance of academician Victor Panin who established and developed physical mesomechanics of materials, uniting physical materials with solid mechanics at macrolevel and with physics of plastic deformation at microlevel. Within this framework, he developed new methods of computer design materials and technologies of their production. Deep mesomechanics ideas can be successfully used in the new approach to earthquake prediction where the seismic source mesostructure appears to be an intermediate term precursor.

See also
 Institute of Strength Physics and Materials Science SB RAS

References

External links
 ISPMS director
 ISPMS sovet
 Viktor Panin in ISPMS SB RAS
 Academicians of Russian Academy of Sciences

Soviet physicists
20th-century Russian physicists
1930 births
2020 deaths
Tomsk State University alumni
Academic staff of Tomsk State University
Full Members of the USSR Academy of Sciences
Full Members of the Russian Academy of Sciences
Foreign Members of the National Academy of Sciences of Belarus